Henry Girard Ostdiek (April 12, 1881 – May 6, 1956) was a reserve catcher in Major League Baseball who played for the Cleveland Naps (1904) and Boston Red Sox (1908) during his major league career. He was born in Ottumwa, Iowa.

In an eight-game career, Ostdiek was a .143 hitter (3-for-21) with three RBI, one run, and one triple without a home run. In eight catching appearances, he posted a .935 fielding percentage, committing three errors in 46 chances.

Ostdiek died at the age of 75 in Minneapolis, Minnesota.

External links

1881 births
1956 deaths
Boston Red Sox players
Cleveland Naps players
Major League Baseball catchers
Baseball players from Iowa
Minor league baseball managers
Fort Wayne Railroaders players
Canton Red Stockings players
Canton Chinamen players
Youngstown Champs players
Providence Grays (minor league) players
Spokane Indians managers
Spokane Indians players
People from Ottumwa, Iowa